Pristimantis sanguineus is a species of frog in the family Strabomantidae.
It is endemic to Colombia.
Its natural habitats are tropical moist lowland forests, moist montane forests, and rivers.
It is threatened by habitat loss.

References

sanguineus
Amphibians of Colombia
Endemic fauna of Colombia
Amphibians described in 1998
Taxonomy articles created by Polbot